Publius Cornelius Tacitus, known simply as Tacitus (– ), was a Roman historian and politician. Tacitus is widely regarded as one of the greatest Roman historians by modern scholars.

The surviving portions of his two major works—the Annals (Latin: Annales) and the Histories (Latin: Historiae)—examine the reigns of the emperors Tiberius, Claudius, Nero, and those who reigned in the Year of the Four Emperors (69 AD). These two works span the history of the Roman Empire from the death of Augustus (14 AD) to the death of Domitian (96 AD), although there are substantial lacunae in the surviving texts.

Tacitus's other writings discuss oratory (in dialogue format, see Dialogus de oratoribus), Germania (in De origine et situ Germanorum), and the life of his father-in-law, Agricola (the general responsible for much of the Roman conquest of Britain), mainly focusing on his campaign in Britannia (De vita et moribus Iulii Agricolae). Tacitus's Annals are of interest for providing an early account of the persecution of Christians and the one of the earliest extra-Biblical reference to the crucifixion of Jesus.

Life
Details about the personal life of Tacitus are scarce. What little is known comes from scattered hints throughout his work, the letters of his friend and admirer Pliny the Younger, and an inscription found at Mylasa in Caria.

Tacitus was born in 56 or 57 to an equestrian family. The place and date of his birth, as well as his praenomen (first name) are not known. In the letters of Sidonius Apollinaris his name is Gaius, but in the major surviving manuscript of his work his name is given as Publius. One scholar's suggestion of the name Sextus has been largely rejected.

Family and early life
Most of the older aristocratic families failed to survive the proscriptions which took place at the end of the Republic, and Tacitus makes it clear that he owed his rank to the Flavian emperors (Hist. 1.1). The claim that he was descended from a freedman is derived from a speech in his writings which asserts that many senators and knights were descended from freedmen (Ann. 13.27), but this is generally disputed.

In his article on Tacitus in Pauly-Wissowa, I. Borzsak had conjectured that the historian was related to Thrasea Paetus and Etruscan family of Caecinii, about whom he spoke very highly. Furthermore, some later Caecinii bore cognomen Tacitus, which also could indicate some sort of relationship. It had been suggested that historian's mother was a daughter of Aulus Caecina Paetus, suffect consul of 37, and sister of Arria, wife of Thrasea.

His father may have been the Cornelius Tacitus who served as procurator of Belgica and Germania; Pliny the Elder mentions that Cornelius had a son who aged rapidly (NH 7.76), which implies an early death. 

There is no mention of Tacitus's suffering such a condition, but it is possible that this refers to a brother—if Cornelius was indeed his father. 

The friendship between the younger Pliny and Tacitus leads some scholars to conclude that they were both the offspring of wealthy provincial families.

The province of his birth remains unknown, though various conjectures suggest Gallia Belgica, Gallia Narbonensis, or Northern Italy. His marriage to the daughter of Narbonensian senator Gnaeus Julius Agricola implies that he came from Gallia Narbonensis. Tacitus's dedication to Lucius Fabius Justus in the Dialogus may indicate a connection with Spain, and his friendship with Pliny suggests origins in northern Italy. 

No evidence exists, however, that Pliny's friends from northern Italy knew Tacitus, nor do Pliny's letters hint that the two men had a common background. Pliny Book 9, Letter 23, reports that when asked whether he was Italian or provincial, he gave an unclear answer and so was asked whether he was Tacitus or Pliny. Since Pliny was from Italy, some infer that Tacitus was from the provinces, probably Gallia Narbonensis.

His ancestry, his skill in oratory, and his sympathetic depiction of barbarians who resisted Roman rule (e.g., Ann. 2.9) have led some to suggest that he was a Celt. This belief stems from the fact that the Celts who had occupied Gaul prior to the Roman invasion were famous for their skill in oratory and had been subjugated by Rome.

Public life, marriage, and literary career
As a young man, Tacitus studied rhetoric in Rome to prepare for a career in law and politics; like Pliny, he may have studied under Quintilian ( – ).  In 77 or 78, he married Julia Agricola, daughter of the famous general Agricola. 

Little is known of their domestic life, save that Tacitus loved hunting and the outdoors. He started his career (probably the latus clavus, mark of the senator) under Vespasian (r. 69–79), but entered political life as a quaestor in 81 or 82 under Titus. 

He advanced steadily through the cursus honorum, becoming praetor in 88 and a quindecimvir, a member of the priestly college in charge of the Sibylline Books and the Secular Games. He gained acclaim as a lawyer and as an orator; his skill in public speaking ironically counterpoints his cognomen, Tacitus ("silent").

He and his property survived Domitian's reign of terror (81–96), but the experience left him jaded and perhaps ashamed at his own complicity, installing in him the hatred of tyranny evident in his works. The Agricola, chs. 44–45, is illustrative:
Agricola was spared those later years during which Domitian, leaving now no interval or breathing space of time, but, as it were, with one continuous blow, drained the life-blood of the Commonwealth... It was not long before our hands dragged Helvidius to prison, before we gazed on the dying looks of Mauricus and Rusticus, before we were steeped in Senecio's innocent blood. Even Nero turned his eyes away, and did not gaze upon the atrocities which he ordered; with Domitian it was the chief part of our miseries to see and to be seen, to know that our sighs were being recorded...

From his seat in the Senate, he became suffect consul in 97 during the reign of Nerva, being the first of his family to do so. During his tenure, he reached the height of his fame as an orator when he delivered the funeral oration for the famous veteran soldier Lucius Verginius Rufus.

In the following year, he wrote and published the Agricola and Germania, foreshadowing the literary endeavors that would occupy him until his death. 

Afterward, he absented himself from public life, but returned during Trajan's reign (98–117). In 100, he and his friend Pliny the Younger prosecuted  (proconsul of Africa) for corruption. Priscus was found guilty and sent into exile; Pliny wrote a few days later that Tacitus had spoken "with all the majesty which characterizes his usual style of oratory".

A lengthy absence from politics and law followed while he wrote the Histories and the Annals. In 112 to 113, he held the highest civilian governorship, that of the Roman province of Asia in western Anatolia, recorded in the inscription found at Mylasa mentioned above. A passage in the Annals fixes 116 as the terminus post quem of his death, which may have been as late as 125 or even 130. It seems that he survived both Pliny (died ) and Trajan (died 117).

It remains unknown whether Tacitus had any children. The Augustan History reports that Emperor Marcus Claudius Tacitus (r. 275–276) claimed him for an ancestor and provided for the preservation of his works, but this story may be fraudulent, like much of the Augustan History.

Works

Five works ascribed to Tacitus have survived (albeit with gaps), the most substantial of which are the Annals and the Histories. This canon (with approximate dates) consists of:
 (98) De vita Iulii Agricolae (The Life of Agricola)
 (98) De origine et situ Germanorum (Germania)
 (102) Dialogus de oratoribus (Dialogue on Oratory)
 (105) Historiae (Histories)
 (117) Ab excessu divi Augusti (Annals)

History of the Roman Empire from the death of Augustus
The Annals and the Histories, published separately, were meant to form a single edition of thirty books.
Although Tacitus wrote the Histories before the Annals, the events in the Annals precede the Histories; together they form a continuous narrative from the death of Augustus (14) to the death of Domitian (96). Though most has been lost, what remains is an invaluable record of the era. The first half of the Annals survived in a single manuscript from Corvey Abbey in Germany, and the second half in a single manuscript from Monte Cassino in Italy, and it is remarkable that they survived at all.

The Histories

In an early chapter of the Agricola, Tacitus asserts that he wishes to speak about the years of Domitian, Nerva and Trajan. In the Histories the scope has changed; Tacitus says that he will deal with the age of Nerva and Trajan at a later time. Instead, he will cover the period from the civil wars of the Year of the Four Emperors and end with the despotism of the Flavians. Only the first four books and twenty-six chapters of the fifth book survive, covering the year 69 and the first part of 70. The work is believed to have continued up to the death of Domitian on September 18, 96. The fifth book contains—as a prelude to the account of Titus's suppression of the First Jewish–Roman War—a short ethnographic survey of the ancient Jews, and it is an invaluable record of Roman attitudes towards them.

The Annals

The Annals, Tacitus's final work, covers the period from the death of Augustus in AD 14. He wrote at least sixteen books, but books 7–10 and parts of books 5, 6, 11, and 16 are missing. Book 6 ends with the death of Tiberius, and books 7–12 presumably covered the reigns of Caligula and Claudius. The remaining books cover the reign of Nero, perhaps until his death in June 68 or until the end of that year to connect with the Histories. The second half of book 16 is missing, ending with the events of 66. It is not known whether Tacitus completed the work; he died before he could complete his planned histories of Nerva and Trajan, and no record survives of the work on Augustus and the beginnings of the Roman Empire, with which he had planned to finish his work. The Annals is one of the earliest secular historical records to mention Christ, which Tacitus does in connection with Nero's persecution of the Christians.

Monographs
Tacitus wrote three works with a more limited scope: Agricola, a biography of his father-in-law, Gnaeus Julius Agricola; the Germania, a monograph on the lands and tribes of barbarian Germania; and the Dialogus, a dialogue on the art of rhetoric.

Germania

The Germania (Latin title: De Origine et situ Germanorum) is an ethnographic work on the Germanic tribes outside the Roman Empire. The Germania fits within a classical ethnographic tradition which includes authors such as Herodotus and Julius Caesar. The book begins (chapters 1–27) with a description of the lands, laws, and customs of the various tribes. Later chapters focus on descriptions of particular tribes, beginning with those who lived closest to the Roman empire, and ending with a description of those who lived on the shores of the Baltic Sea, such as the Fenni. Tacitus had written a similar, albeit shorter, piece in his Agricola (chapters 10–13).

Agricola (De vita et moribus Iulii Agricolae)

The Agricola (written ) recounts the life of Gnaeus Julius Agricola, an eminent Roman general and Tacitus's father-in-law; it also covers, briefly, the geography and ethnography of ancient Britain. As in the Germania, Tacitus favorably contrasts the liberty of the native Britons with the tyranny and corruption of the Empire; the book also contains eloquent polemics against the greed of Rome, one of which, that Tacitus claims is from a speech by Calgacus, ends by asserting, Auferre trucidare rapere falsis nominibus imperium, atque ubi solitudinem faciunt, pacem appellant. ("To ravage, to slaughter, to usurp under false titles, they call empire; and where they make a desert, they call it peace."—Oxford Revised Translation).

Dialogus

There is uncertainty about when Tacitus wrote Dialogus de oratoribus. Many characteristics set it apart from the other works of Tacitus, so that its authenticity has at various times been questioned. It is likely to be early work, indebted to the author's rhetorical training, since its style imitates that of the foremost Roman orator Cicero. It lacks (for example) the incongruities that are typical of his mature historical works. The Dialogus is dedicated to Fabius Iustus, a consul in 102 AD.

Literary style
Tacitus's writings are known for their dense prose that seldom glosses the facts, in contrast to the style of some of his contemporaries, such as Plutarch. When he writes about a near defeat of the Roman army in Annals I,63, he does so with brevity of description rather than embellishment.

In most of his writings, he keeps to a chronological narrative order, only seldom outlining the bigger picture, leaving the readers to construct that picture for themselves. Nonetheless, where he does use broad strokes, for example, in the opening paragraphs of the Annals, he uses a few condensed phrases which take the reader to the heart of the story.

Approach to history
Tacitus's historical style owes some debt to Sallust. His historiography offers penetrating—often pessimistic—insights into the psychology of power politics, blending straightforward descriptions of events, moral lessons, and tightly focused dramatic accounts. Tacitus's own declaration regarding his approach to history (Annals I,1) is well known:
inde consilium mihi ... tradere ... sine ira et studio, quorum causas procul habeo.
my purpose is ... to relate ... without either anger or zeal, motives from which I am far removed.

There has been much scholarly discussion about Tacitus's "neutrality". Throughout his writing, he is preoccupied with the balance of power between the Senate and the emperors, and the increasing corruption of the governing classes of Rome as they adjusted to the ever-growing wealth and power of the empire. In Tacitus's view, senators squandered their cultural inheritance—that of free speech—to placate their (rarely benign) emperor.

Tacitus noted the increasing dependence of the emperor on the goodwill of his armies. The Julio-Claudians eventually gave way to generals, who followed Julius Caesar (and Sulla and Pompey) in recognizing that military might could secure them the political power in Rome. (Hist. 1.4)

Welcome as the death of Nero had been in the first burst of joy, yet it had not only roused various emotions in Rome, among the Senators, the people, or the soldiery of the capital, it had also excited all the legions and their generals; for now had been divulged that secret of the empire, that emperors could be made elsewhere than at Rome.

Tacitus's political career was largely lived out under the emperor Domitian. His experience of the tyranny, corruption, and decadence of that era (81–96) may explain the bitterness and irony of his political analysis. He draws our attention to the dangers of power without accountability, love of power untempered by principle, and the apathy and corruption engendered by the concentration of wealth generated through trade and conquest by the empire.

Nonetheless, the image he builds of Tiberius throughout the first six books of the Annals is neither exclusively bleak nor approving: most scholars view the image of Tiberius as predominantly positive in the first books, and predominantly negative after the intrigues of Sejanus. The entrance of Tiberius in the first chapters of the first book is dominated by the hypocrisy of the new emperor and his courtiers. In the later books, some respect is evident for the cleverness of the old emperor in securing his position.

In general, Tacitus does not fear to praise and to criticize the same person, often noting what he takes to be their more admirable and less admirable properties. One of Tacitus's hallmarks is refraining from conclusively taking sides for or against persons he describes, which has led some to interpret his works as both supporting and rejecting the imperial system (see Tacitean studies, Black vs. Red Tacitists).

Prose
His Latin style is highly praised. His style, although it has a grandeur and eloquence (thanks to Tacitus's education in rhetoric), is extremely concise, even epigrammatic—the sentences are rarely flowing or beautiful, but their point is always clear. The style has been both derided as "harsh, unpleasant, and thorny" and praised as "grave, concise, and pithily eloquent".

A passage of Annals 1.1, where Tacitus laments the state of the historiography regarding the last four emperors of the Julio-Claudian dynasty, illustrates his style: "The histories of Tiberius, Gaius, Claudius and Nero, while they were in power, were falsified through terror and after their death were written under the irritation of a recent hatred", or in a word-for-word translation:

Compared to the Ciceronian period, where sentences were usually the length of a paragraph and artfully constructed with nested pairs of carefully matched sonorous phrases, this is short and to the point. But it is also very individual. Note the three different ways of saying and in the first line (-que, et, ac), and especially the matched second and third lines. They are parallel in sense but not in sound; the pairs of words ending "-entibus … -is" are crossed over in a way that deliberately breaks the Ciceronian conventions—which one would, however, need to be acquainted with to see the novelty of Tacitus's style. Some readers, then and now, find this teasing of their expectations merely irritating. Others find the deliberate discord, playing against the evident parallelism of the two lines, stimulating and intriguing.

His historical works focus on the motives of the characters, often with penetrating insight—though it is questionable how much of his insight is correct, and how much is convincing only because of his rhetorical skill. He is at his best when exposing hypocrisy and dissimulation; for example, he follows a narrative recounting Tiberius's refusal of the title pater patriae by recalling the institution of a law forbidding any "treasonous" speech or writings—and the frivolous prosecutions which resulted (Annals, 1.72). Elsewhere (Annals 4.64–66) he compares Tiberius's public distribution of fire relief to his failure to stop the perversions and abuses of justice which he had begun. Although this kind of insight has earned him praise, he has also been criticized for ignoring the larger context.

Tacitus owes most, both in language and in method, to Sallust, and Ammianus Marcellinus is the later historian whose work most closely approaches him in style.

Sources
Tacitus makes use of the official sources of the Roman state: the Acta Senatus (the minutes of the sessions of the Senate) and the Acta Diurna (a collection of the acts of the government and news of the court and capital). He also read collections of emperors' speeches, such as those of Tiberius and Claudius. He is generally seen as a scrupulous historian who paid careful attention to his sources.

Tacitus cites some of his sources directly, among them Cluvius Rufus, Fabius Rusticus and Pliny the Elder, who had written Bella Germaniae and a historical work which was the continuation of that of Aufidius Bassus. Tacitus also uses collections of letters (epistolarium). He also took information from exitus illustrium virorum. These were a collection of books by those who were antithetical to the emperors. They tell of sacrifices by martyrs to freedom, especially the men who committed suicide. While he places no value on the Stoic theory of suicide and views suicides as ostentatious and politically useless, Tacitus often gives prominence to speeches made by those about to commit suicide, for example Cremutius Cordus' speech in Ann. IV, 34–35.

Editions

Teubner
Koestermann prepared then a second edition published in 1960-70. It is now outdated. A completely new Teubner editon (with the same title) was published in 1978-83. Yet another Teubner edition was prepared by István Borzsák and Kenneth Wellesley in 1986-92: Borzsák edited books I–VI of the Annals, and Wellesley books XI–XVI and the Histories. This edition remains unfinished, as the last volume containing the three minor opuscles was never issued.

Cambridge Classical Texts and Commentaries
Goodyear, F. R. D. (1972) The Annals of Tacitus, Books 1–6. Vol. I: Annals I.1—54. Cambridge University Press.
Goodyear, F. R. D. (1981) The Annals of Tacitus, Books 1–6. Vol. II: Annals I.55—81 and Annals II. Cambridge University Press.
Woodman, A. J. and Martin, Ronald H. (2004) The Annals of Tacitus, Book 3. Cambridge University Press.
Woodman, A. J. (2018)  The Annals of Tacitus, Book 4. Cambridge University Press.
Woodman, A. J. (2016)  The Annals of Tacitus, Books 5–6. Cambridge University Press.
Malloch, S. J. V. (2013) The Annals of Tacitus, Book 11. Cambridge Classical Texts and Commentaries. Cambridge University Press.

Cambridge Greek and Latin Classics
Martin, R. H. and Woodman, A. J. (1989) Tacitus: Annals, Book IV. Cambridge University Press.
Ash, Rhiannon (2018) Tacitus: Annals, Book XV. Cambridge University Press.
Damon, Cynthia (2003) Tacitus: Histories Book I. Cambridge University Press.
Ash, Rhiannon (2007) Tacitus: Histories Book II. Cambridge University Press.
Woodman, A. J., with Kraus, C. S. (2014) Tacitus: Agricola. Cambridge University Press.
Mayer, Roland (2001) Tacitus: Dialogus de oratoribus. Cambridge University Press.

See also
 The Republic (Plato): Tacitus' critique of "model state" philosophies
 Tacitus on Christ: a well-known passage from the Annals mentions the death of Jesus of Nazareth (Ann., xv 44)
 Claude Fauchet: the first person to translate all of Tacitus's works into French
 Justus Lipsius: produced an extremely influential early modern edition of Tacitus (1574)

References

Notes

Citations

Bibliography

 Benario, Herbert W. An Introduction to Tacitus. (Athens, GA: University of Georgia Press, 1975) 
 
 Burke, P. "Tacitism" in Dorey, T.A., 1969, pp. 149–171
 Damon, Cynthia. "Relatio vs. Oratio: Tacitus, Ann. 3.12 and the Senatus Consultum De Cn. Pisone Patre." The Classical Quarterly, vol. 49, no. 1, (1999), pp. 336–338
 Damon, Cynthia. "The Trial of Cn. Piso in Tacitus' Annals and the 'Senatus Consultum De Cn. Pisone Patre': New Light on Narrative Technique". The American Journal of Philology, vol. 120, no. 1, (1999), pp. 143–162. .
 Damon, Cynthia. Writing with Posterity in Mind: Thucydides and Tacitus on Secession. In The Oxford Handbook of Thucydides. (Oxford University Press, 2017).
 Dudley, Donald R. The World of Tacitus (London: Secker and Warburg, 1968) 
 Goodyear, F.R.D. The Annals of Tacitus, vol. 2 (Cambridge: Cambridge University Press, 1981). Commentary on Annals 1.55–81 and Annals 2.
 Gordon, Mary L. "The Patria of Tacitus". The Journal of Roman Studies, Vol. 26, Part 2 (1936), pp. 145–151.
 Martin, Ronald. Tacitus (London: Batsford, 1981)
 Mellor, Ronald. Tacitus (New York / London: Routledge, 1993) 
 Mellor, Ronald. Tacitus’ Annals (Oxford/New York: Oxford University Press, 2010) (Oxford Approaches to Classical Literature) 
 Mellor, Ronald (ed.). Tacitus: The Classical Heritage (New York: Garland Publishing, 1995) 
 Mendell, Clarence. Tacitus: The Man and His Work. (New Haven: Yale University Press, 1957) 
 Oliver, Revilo P. "The First Medicean MS of Tacitus and the Titulature of Ancient Books". Transactions and Proceedings of the American Philological Association, Vol. 82 (1951), pp. 232–261.
 Oliver, Revilo P. "The Praenomen of Tacitus". The American Journal of Philology, Vol. 98, No. 1 (Spring, 1977), pp. 64–70.
 Ostler, Nicholas. Ad Infinitum: A Biography of Latin. HarperCollins in the UK, and Walker & Co. in the US: London and New York, 2007. ; 2009 edition:  – 2010 e-book: 
 Syme, Ronald. Tacitus, Volumes 1 and 2. (Oxford: Oxford University Press, 1958) (reprinted in 1985 by the same publisher, with the ) is the definitive study of his life and works.
 Tacitus, The Annals of Imperial Rome. Translated by Michael Grant and first published in this form in 1956. (London: The Folio Society, 2006)
 Tacitus, Germany. Translated by Herbert W. Benario. (Warminster, UK: Aris & Phillips Ltd., 1999. )
 Taylor, John W. Tacitus and the Boudican Revolt. (Dublin, Ireland: Camuvlos, 1998)

External links

Works by Tacitus
 
 
 

 Works by Tacitus at Perseus Digital Library
 Comprehensive links to Latin text and translations in various languages at ForumRomanum
 Complete works, Latin and English translation at "The Internet Sacred Text Archive" (not listed above)
 Agricola and Annals 15.20–23, 33–45 at Dickinson College Commentaries

 
1st-century Gallo-Roman people
1st-century Latin writers
1st-century historians
2nd-century Gallo-Roman people
2nd-century historians
2nd-century Latin writers
50s births
120s deaths
Year of birth uncertain
Year of death uncertain
Ancient Roman jurists
Ancient Roman rhetoricians
Cornelii
Latin historians
Roman governors of Asia
Roman-era biographers
Senators of the Roman Empire
Silver Age Latin writers
Suffect consuls of Imperial Rome